Jenner, also known as Jenner-by-the-Sea, is a small coastal town and census-designated place (CDP) in Sonoma County, California, U.S. with a population of about 122 per the 2020 census. It is located on the Pacific coast near the mouth of the Russian River. State Route 1 runs through the town and State Route 116 runs nearby, along the Russian River.  Immediately south of Jenner is Goat Rock Beach, a unit within the Sonoma Coast State Beach.

History
Historically, Jenner was part of the Rancho Muniz. The town’s namesake, Dr. Elijah K. Jenner, was a dentist and inventor from Vermont. When his son Charles K. was born in 1846, the family was living in Wisconsin. Elijah came west in 1850 and sought his fortune in the California goldfields. His patent application included a model pump made of pure gold, which is the only golden model that the Patent Office has ever received.

Jenner’s family joined him in 1852. Traveling by ship from the Great Lakes to Panama, it crossed the Isthmus and sailed up the Pacific Coast. By 1854, the Jenners had settled near the mouth of the Russian River and built a house in what became known as Jenner Gulch, the site of the town. Charles K. Jenner would go on to be a prominent attorney in early Seattle, arguing several cases in front of the U.S. Supreme Court.

Jenner received media attention in 2004 after the bodies of Lindsay Cutshall and Jason S. Allen were discovered on Fish Head Beach just north of town. The incident became known as the Jenner, California double-murder of 2004.

Geography
According to the United States Census Bureau, the CDP covers an area of 2.4 square miles (6.2 km2), 2.1 square miles (5.5 km2) of it land, and 0.3 square miles (0.7 km2) of it (12.00%) water.

Demographics

2010
The 2010 United States Census reported that Jenner had a population of 136. The racial makeup of the CDP was 91.9% White, 1.5% African American, 1.5% Asian, and 5.1% from two or more races. 5.9% of the population was Hispanic or Latino of any race.

The Census reported that 100% of the population lived in households.

There were 80 households, out of which 6 (7.5%) had children under the age of 18 living in them, 26 (32.5%) were opposite-sex married couples living together, 6 (7.5%) had a female householder with no husband present, 2 (2.5%) had a male householder with no wife present.  There were 6 (7.5%) unmarried opposite-sex partnerships, and 2 (2.5%) same-sex married couples or partnerships. 36 households (45.0%) were made up of individuals, and 9 (11.3%) had someone living alone who was 65 years of age or older. The average household size was 1.70.  There were 34 families (42.5% of all households); the average family size was 2.24.

The population was spread out, with 7 people (5.1%) under the age of 18, 3 people (2.2%) aged 18 to 24, 15 people (11.0%) aged 25 to 44, 81 people (59.6%) aged 45 to 64, and 30 people (22.1%) who were 65 years of age or older.  The median age was 58.5 years. For every 100 females, there were 106.1 males.  For every 100 females age 18 and over, there were 115.0 males.

The homeowner vacancy rate was 1.9%; the rental vacancy rate was 35.7%. 67.6% of the population lived in owner-occupied housing units and 32.4% lived in rental housing units.

2000
As of Census 2000, figures for Jenner's zip code showed that of the primary languages spoken in Jenner 94% spoke English while 6% did not; of those, 2% spoke French, 2% spoke Spanish, 1% spoke German, 1% spoke Urdu, and less than 1% spoke a Native American language.

Climate
Jenner experiences a cool summer Mediterranean climate (Köppen climate classification Csb) typical of coastal areas of California. The wet season, typified by heavy rainfall, is from October to May. Summers are often overcast, the sun blocked by marine layer clouds that keep it cool, humid, and often drizzly in the night and morning hours.

References

External links
 Jenner, California

Populated coastal places in California
Census-designated places in Sonoma County, California
Census-designated places in California